Hiletus is a genus of ground beetles. All of the species in the genus live in the tropical forests of Africa.

Species 

The genus Hiletus contains 6 species:

References 

Hiletinae
Beetles of Africa